Walo Lüönd (born 13 April 1927 in Zug, died 17 June 2012 in Locarno) was a Swiss movie actor, best known for his role in the movie The Swissmakers (Die Schweizermacher) along with comedian Emil Steinberger. He has had roles in 102 films and television shows.

He had been married with Eva-Maria Bendig since 1957; they have two children, Daniel (1957-1987) and Oliver (b. 1958).

He died on 17 June 2012, at the age of 85 in a hospital in Locarno, Ticino, due to pneumonia after suffering a hip fracture in his residence in Losone. His funeral took place on Tuesday, 26 June, in Untersiggenthal in the canton of Aargau.

Selected filmography
 Palace Hotel (1952)
 Café Oriental (1962)
  (1965, TV miniseries)
 The Swissmakers (1978)
 Bread and Stones (1979)
 Sternenberg (2004)

References

External links 
  

1927 births
2012 deaths
People from Zug
Swiss male film actors
Swiss male television actors
20th-century Swiss male actors
21st-century Swiss male actors
Deaths from pneumonia in Switzerland
People from Locarno